This is a list of notable individuals who are or were natives, or notable as residents of, or in association with the American city of New Orleans, Louisiana.

Academia 
Will W. Alexander, first president of Dillard University and head of the Commission on Interracial Cooperation 
Stephen Ambrose, historian and University of New Orleans professor
William Balée, anthropologist and Tulane University professor
Charles C. Bass, physician and researcher in tropical medicine and dental health
Elizabeth Bass, physician, educator, and suffragist 
Stanhope Bayne-Jones, physician, member of US Surgeon General's Committee linking smoking to cancer
Joan W. Bennett, biologist and former Tulane University professor
Florence Borders, archivist and historian at the Amistad Research Center 
Cyril Y. Bowers, physician and endocrinology researcher
Rick Brewer, president of Louisiana College since 2015; born in New Orleans in 1956
Douglas Brinkley, historian, author and former University of New Orleans and Tulane University professor
Brené Brown, professor of social work; author 
George E. Burch, pioneering physician, cardiovascular disease researcher, medical school professor
John R. Conniff, educator and university administrator
Scott Cowen, president of Tulane University 
Michael DeBakey, pioneer in heart surgery
Albert W. Dent, president of Dillard University, chief executive of Flint-Goodridge Hospital
James H. Dillard, educator, advocate for education of African-Americans
John Duffy, medical historian
Michael T. Dugan, educator and accounting scholar
Joseph Ewan, botanist and biology professor
Alcée Fortier, folklorist, historian, and university professor
Mary L. Good, scientist and university professor
Clifton H. Johnson, historian and founder of the Amistad Research Center 
Eamon Kelly, President of Tulane University
Salman Khan, educator
James A. Knight, psychiatrist, theologian, and medical ethicist
Rudolph Matas, innovative surgeon at Tulane Medical School
Gordon H. Mueller, historian and administrator at the University of New Orleans
Alton Ochsner, surgeon and medical researcher, founded the Ochsner Medical Center
Max Rafferty, public school administrator and writer
Andrew V. Schally, endocrinologist and Nobel Laureate
Mary S. Sherman, cancer researcher and physician
Royal D. Suttkus, biologist, founder of a major ichthyology collection
Lewis Thomas, physician, researcher, and author of popular non-fiction
Jeffrey Vitter, computer scientist and Purdue University dean
Harold E. Vokes, zoologist and paleontologist

Architecture 

Jean-Louis Dolliole, architect-builder who was a free person of color in the Antebellum era
James Freret, architect, designed many 19th century homes in New Orleans
William Alfred Freret, architect, supervising architect for federal building in the 19th century
James Gallier Jr., architect, designed the French Opera House in New Orleans
Moise H. Goldstein Sr., architect of extensive designs in the early 20th century
Henry Howard, 19th century Irish-American architect
Albert C. Ledner, 20th century architect
Emile Weil, 20th century architect
Leon C. Weiss, architect commissioned by Huey P. Long
Elizebeth Thomas Werlein, conservationist of the French Quarter of New Orleans

Arts and literature 

Enrique Alferez, sculptor
John James Audubon, painter, ornithologist, naturalist
Vernel Bagneris, playwright, actor, director, singer, dancer
E. J. Bellocq, photographer
Eloise Bibb Thompson, poet, fiction writer, and playwright
Skip Bolen, photographer
Roark Bradford, fiction writer
Poppy Z. Brite, writer
William S. Burroughs, writer
George Washington Cable, writer
Georgine Campbell, painter
Truman Capote, writer
John Churchill Chase, writer and cartoonist
Kate Chopin, writer, feminist
Marcus Bruce Christian, poet, folklorist and historian
Ben Claassen III, illustrator and comics artist, DIRTFARM
Andrei Codrescu, poet and commentator
Florestine Perrault Collins, photographer 
Alice Dalsheimer, poet
Edgar Degas, artist
Thomas Dent, poet and writer
George Washington Dixon, newspaper editor
Alexander John Drysdale, artist
George Dureau, artist and photographer
William Faulkner, writer
Daniel F. Galouye, science fiction writer
Whitney Gaskell, writer, attended Tulane Law School which was the setting of her 2006 novel Testing Kate
Rolland Golden, artist
Shirley Ann Grau, writer
Lafcadio Hearn, writer
Knute Heldner, artist
Lillian Hellman, writer
George Herriman, Krazy Kat cartoonist
Emma Churchman Hewitt, writer, journalist
May Hyman Lesser, medical illustrator
Walter Isaacson, writer, journalist, public policy analyst
Frances Parkinson Keyes, writer
Grace King, writer
Dominique Lapierre, writer
Elmore Leonard, author
Michael Lewis, writer
Shantrelle P. Lewis, curator
Bunny Matthews, cartoonist
Louis-Alphonse Maureau, painter
Robert Bledsoe Mayfield, artist
John McCrady, artist
James Michalopoulos, artist
Marie Madeleine Seebold Molinary, artist
Gertrude Morgan, artist, musician, poet and preacher
Sergio Rossetti Morosini, diplomat, painter, sculptor, filmmaker, naturalist
Alice Dunbar Nelson, poet, journalist and political activist
Isadora Newman, artist, poet, storyteller, sculptor
David Ohle, writer
Paul E. Poincy, artist
Bart Ramsey, composer, author, singer and jazz musician
Matthew Randazzo V, writer
Anne Rice, writer of vampire tales and other Gothic fiction
John T. Scott, artist and sculptor
Kendall Shaw, abstract expressionist painter
John Kennedy Toole, writer of A Confederacy of Dunces
Alexandrea Weis, author
Lucille Western, actress
William Woodward, painter

Business and economics 
Frank Abadie, businessman and horse race promoter.
Micaela Almonester, 19th-century businesswoman and real estate developer
George Bissell, entrepreneur, founded the first oil company in the United States
Isaac Delgado, businessman and philanthropist, benefactor of Delgado Community College
Constant C. Dejoie Sr., business leader
William C. Edenborn, railroad magnate, industrialist and inventor
Charles E. Fenner, businessperson, co-founder of Fenner & Beane, a forerunner of Merrill Lynch
Ruth Fertel, businesswoman, Ruth's Chris Steakhouse
Avram Glazer, businessman and sports franchise owner
Leon Godchaux, businessman and sugar merchant
Daniel Henry Holmes, 19th-century businessman
Victor Kiam, entrepreneur
Thomy Lafon, businessman, human rights activist
John McDonogh (1779–1850), shipping, land speculation (world's largest private landholder ca. 1850), philanthropist and namesake of many New Orleans schools
Alexander Milne, 18th-century businessman and entrepreneur
Oliver Pollock, merchant, financier of the American Revolutionary War
Benjamin M. Rosen, computer entrepreneur
John G. Schwegmann, supermarket innovator
Clay Shaw, businessman
Edgar B. Stern Sr, businessperson and philanthropist
Patrick F. Taylor, businessperson and philanthropist
Judah Touro, businessman and philanthropist
Martin de Villamil or Martin Villamil (1783–1843), businessman
Philip P. Werlein, music publisher and retailer
Samuel Zemurray, businessman and philanthropist

Cuisine 
Owen Brennan, restaurateur
Leah Chase, chef
Al Copeland, restaurateur, Popeyes Chicken & Biscuits and Copeland's restaurants
Ruth Fertel, restaurateur, Ruth's Chris Steak House
Beulah Levy Ledner, pastry chef
Austin Leslie, chef

Crime 
 Axeman of New Orleans, mysterious mass murderer
 Sylvestro Carolla, mafia boss
 Wilson Chouest, serial rapist and killer of two women in California
 Antoinette Frank, former New Orleans Police Officer
 Ivory Harris, drug trafficker and weapons trafficker
 Jean Lafitte, pirate and brother of Pierre Lafitte
 Pierre Lafitte, pirate and brother of Jean Lafitte
 Delphine LaLaurie, socialite and sadist
 Carlos Marcello, businessman and mafia boss
 Lee Harvey Oswald, assassin
 Ronald A. Williams II, murdered New Orleans police officer

Fictional 
 Mr. Bingle, snowman that assisted Santa Claus and worked at Maison Blanche Department Store
 Benjamin Button, man who is born old and grows young, in a film loosely adapted from an F. Scott Fitzgerald short story 
 Louis de Pointe du Lac, vampire appearing in Anne Rice's The Vampire Chronicles
 Ignatius J. Reilly, hero of John Kennedy Toole's novel A Confederacy of Dunces (1980)
 Seymore D. Fair, 1984 Louisiana World Exposition Mascot, celebrity cartoon character, advocate for animal, people, and planet welfare
 Gambit, Marvel Comics superhero (X-Men)
 Marcel Gerard, vampire appearing in Julie Plec's The Originals
 Hazel Levesque, previous residence before moving and first death, appearing in Heroes of Olympus by Rick Riordan
 Morgus the Magnificent, mad scientist and horror movie host
 Dwayne Cassius "King" Pride, NCIS Supervisory Agent, NCIS: New Orleans
 Benjamin Sisko, Starfleet captain (Star Trek: Deep Space Nine)

Film and television 

Yahya Abdul-Mateen II, actor 
Bryan Batt, actor
Sandra Bullock, actress, resident 
Kitty Carlisle, entertainer
Paul Carr, actor
John Carroll, actor and singer
Laura Cayouette, actor and author
Patricia Clarkson, actress
Marshall Colt, psychologist and former actor
Frank Joseph Davis, television journalist and cookbook author
Bianca Del Rio, drag queen and comedian
Ellen DeGeneres, comedian, talk show host
Vance DeGeneres, actor, screenwriter, and musician (bass)
Raquel "Rocsi" Diaz, television host and personality on BET's 106 and Park
Faith Domergue, actress
Donna Douglas, actress (Ellie Mae from The Beverly Hillbillies)
Allison Harvard, runner-up of twelfth cycle of America's Next Top Model
Dwight Henry, actor
Gloria Henry, actress born in New Orleans in 1923
Cheryl Holdridge, actress and Mouseketeer
Indigo, actress
Eddie Jemison, actor
Bayn Johnson, former child actress and singer
Leatrice Joy, actress
Dorothy Lamour, actress
John Larroquette, actor
Sabrina LeBeauf, actress
Anthony Mackie, actor
Evan Mather, director
Tristin Mays, actress
Adah Isaacs Menken, actress
Taylor Miller, actress
Garrett Morris, comedian (SNL), actor
Ed Nelson, actor
Arthel Neville, journalist
Chris Owens, burlesque performer and entrepreneur
Pauley Perrette, actress
Tyler Perry, actor, director
Wendell Pierce, actor, Detective Bunk Moreland in The Wire
Godfrey Reggio, experimental filmmaker/documentarian (Qatsi trilogy)
Stassi Schroeder, tv personality model and author
Al Shea, actor and theatre critic
Neferteri Shepherd, model and actress
Sydney Shields, stage actress
Richard Simmons, entertainer
Harold Sylvester, film actor
Jay Thomas, actor
Sam Trammell, actor, best known for his role as Sam Merlotte in True Blood
Ben Turpin, silent film comedian
Ray Walston, actor
Carl Weathers, actor, football player
Walter Williams, creator of Mr. Bill
Tommy Wiseau, actor, director
Cora Witherspoon, actress
Reese Witherspoon, actress
Grace Zabriskie, actress

Journalism 
Jim Amoss, journalist and newspaper editor
Jason Berry, investigative journalist and historian
David Bernard, television meteorologist
James Carville, Democratic Party political consultant and pundit
Buddy Diliberto, sports journalist
Dorothy Dix, journalist
Christopher Drew, investigative reporter
Charles L. "Pie" Dufour, newspaper columnist and historian
Hap Glaudi, television sportscaster
Victor Gold, journalist and political consultant, reared in New Orleans 
Bryant Gumbel, television anchor
Greg Gumbel, television sportscaster
Ira B. Harkey Jr., newspaper journalist, civil rights advocate
Jim Henderson, television sportscaster
Iris Kelso, journalist for three New Orleans newspapers and WDSU television commentator
Hoda Kotb, television anchor
Mel Leavitt, television journalist and historian
Angus Lind, newspaper journalist
Wayne Mack, television sportscaster
John Maginnis, journalist, political commentator, and author of The Last Hayride, The Cross to Bear, and The Politics of Reform
Ora Mae Lewis Martin, journalist
Mary Matalin, Republican Party political consultant
Bill Monroe, NBC television journalist
Arthel Neville, television anchor
Cokie Roberts, ABC television journalist and commentator for National Public Radio
Nash Roberts, television meteorologist
Garland Robinette, investigative journalist
Louis Charles Roudanez, founder of The New Orleans Tribune newspaper
Lyle Saxon, journalist
Howard K. Smith, television anchorman
Ronnie Virgets, writer and broadcast journalist

Law, politics, and military 
Bryan Adams, former member of the Louisiana House of Representatives from Jefferson Parish since 2012; born in New Orleans.
Reverend Avery Alexander, civil rights leader, state legislator
Andres Almonaster y Rojas, Spanish civil servant in colonial New Orleans, also a philanthropist
Jeff Arnold, former member of the Louisiana House for the Algiers section, 2002–2016
John B. Babcock, Medal of Honor recipient
Amy Coney Barrett, U.S. Supreme Court Justice and academic
P.G.T. Beauregard, Confederate general and inventor
Clyde F. Bel Jr., businessman and state representative for Orleans Parish, 1964–1972 and 1975–1980
Judah P. Benjamin, U.S. Senator, Confederate Attorney General, Secretary of War and Secretary of State
David H. Berger, commandant of the United States Marine Corps
Hale Boggs, former U.S. Representative
Lindy Boggs, former U.S. Representative and retired U.S. Ambassador to The Vatican
Thomas Hale Boggs Jr., lawyer/lobbyist in Washington, D.C., born in New Orleans in 1940, son of Hale and Lindy Boggs, brother of Cokie Roberts and Barbara Boggs Sigmund
Stephen Bradberry, community organizer, Robert F. Kennedy Human Rights Award laureate
Juan Davis Bradburn, freedom fighter for Mexico, officer in the Battle of New Orleans 
Henry Braden, politician
Elward Thomas Brady Jr., state representative from Terrebonne Parish 1972–1976, born in New Orleans
Donna Brazile, political strategist
Jared Brossett, member of the New Orleans City Council since 2014; state representative for District 97, 2009–2014
J. Marshall Brown, insurance agent and politician
Benjamin F. Butler, administrator of Union-occupied New Orleans during the Civil War
John A. Butler, U.S. Marine Corps officer and Navy Cross recipient
Pascal F. Calogero Jr., Chief Justice Louisiana Supreme Court
Gary Carter Jr., member of the Louisiana House from the Algiers neighborhood, effective 2016
James Carville, political consultant, political science professor
Harry Connick Sr., district attorney, father of singer Harry Connick Jr.
A.G. Crowe, politician
Milton Joseph Cunningham, attorney, state legislator, state attorney general for three nonconsecutive terms ending in 1900
Bernard de Marigny, politician and land developer
Étienne de Boré, first Mayor of New Orleans in the U.S. administration 
James D. Denegre, Minnesota state senator and lawyer
Jean Noel Destréhan, early Creole politician and plantation owner
David Duke, state representative for Metairie 1989–1992; White nationalist
H. Garland Dupré, attorney and politician; Speaker of the Louisiana House 1908–1910; U.S. representative from Louisiana's 2nd congressional district, 1910–1924
Frank Burton Ellis, attorney, politician, federal judge
Albert Estopinal, former U.S. representative and member of both houses of the Louisiana State Legislature
Olaf Fink, member of the Louisiana State Senate 1956–1972; New Orleans educator 
C.B. Forgotston, attorney, political activist, state government watchdog
Henry L. Fuqua, governor who defeated Huey Long in an election
Randal Gaines, state representative since 2012 for St. Charles and St. John the Baptist parishes; former assistant city attorney in New Orleans 
Jim Garrison, district attorney of Orleans Parish
Robert T. Garrity Jr., attorney and former state representative for Jefferson Parish
Charles Gayarré, state legislator noted for his histories of Louisiana
Newt Gingrich, U.S. Congressman from Georgia, Speaker of the U.S. House of Representatives
Nicholas Girod, early mayor of New Orleans
John Grenier, Birmingham lawyer and Alabama Republican Party figure, born in New Orleans in 1930
Brenda Hatfield, former Chief Administrative Officer of the City of New Orleans
F. Edward Hebert, Democrat U.S. Representative for Louisiana's 1st congressional district, 1941–1977
Cynthia Hedge-Morrell, former member of the New Orleans City Council for District D, 2005–2014
Frederick Jacob Reagan Heebe, former judge of the United States District Court for the Eastern District of Louisiana
David Heitmeier, state senator for District 7 since 2008, optometrist
Francis C. Heitmeier, state senator for District 7, 1988–2008; businessman and lobbyist
David Hennessy, police chief, assassinated in 1890
Clay Higgins, Republican member of the United States House of Representatives for Louisiana's 3rd congressional district; born in New Orleans in 1961
Stephanie Hilferty, Republican state representative for Orleans and Jefferson parishes, effective January 2016
Walker Hines, former state representative
Jean Joseph Amable Humbert, army general, subordinate to Andrew Jackson at the Battle of New Orleans
Bernette Joshua Johnson, Chief Justice of the Louisiana Supreme Court since 2013; associate justice, 1994–2013, native and resident of New Orleans
Jeannette Knoll, associate justice of the Louisiana Supreme Court; reared and educated in New Orleans, where the court meets; resides in Marksville
Mary Landrieu, state representative, state treasurer, U.S. senator
Mitch Landrieu, state representative, lieutenant governor, former mayor of New Orleans
Moon Landrieu, judge and politician, mayor of New Orleans
Hank Lauricella, former professional football player; state senator from Jefferson Parish, 1972–1996
Bob Livingston, Republican former U.S. Representative for 1st congressional district
Edward Livingston, drafted Louisiana Civil Code 
Lt. Gen. James Longstreet, Confederate general
Joseph Mansion, Louisiana state legislator, state tax assessor
Bessie Margolin, labor lawyer
Danny Martiny, state senator from Jefferson Parish, born in New Orleans
Harold A. Moise, state representative for the 12th Ward, Orleans civil court judge 1937–1948, and associate justice of the Louisiana Supreme Court 1948–1958
Ernest Nathan Morial, American political, legal, and civil rights leader
Marc Morial, former mayor, son of Ernest Nathan Morial
deLesseps Story Morrison, former mayor and ambassador to the Organization of American States
deLesseps Morrison Jr., late state representative
William Mumford, Confederate resistor in Union-occupied New Orleans during the Civil War
Ray Nagin, former mayor of New Orleans
Michael H. O'Keefe, president of the Louisiana State Senate 1976–1983; convicted felon
Alejandro O'Reilly, governor of Louisiana, known as "Bloody O'Reilly"
Leander Perez, district judge, district attorney, and president of the Plaquemines Parish Commission Council
P.B.S. Pinchback, politician
James Pitot, third mayor of New Orleans
Loulan Pitre Jr., New Orleans lawyer and former state representative for Lafourche Parish
Edward Joseph Price, state representative for District 58, Gonzales businessman, and former resident of New Orleans 
William P. Quigley, activist attorney and academic
Max Rafferty, educator author and columnist, California politician, born in New Orleans in 1917
Cokie Roberts, journalist, daughter of Hale and Lindy Boggs
Steve Scalise, House Minority Whip and U.S. Representative of Louisiana's 1st district
Tom Schedler, former state senator from St. Tammany Parish and current Louisiana secretary of state
Pat Screen, Louisiana State University quarterback, lawyer, and former Mayor-President of East Baton Rouge Parish
Ronal W. Serpas, Superintendent of the New Orleans Police Department since 2010
Joseph A. Shakspeare, Mayor of New Orleans at the time of the March 14, 1891 lynchings 
Eric Skrmetta, attorney from Metairie, Louisiana; Republican member of the Louisiana Public Service Commission for District 1
Jefferson B. Snyder, lived in New Orleans 1893–1897; later district attorney in three delta parishes in northeast Louisiana 1904–1948
James Z. Spearing, attorney, school board member, U.S. representative from Louisiana's 2nd congressional district, 1924–1931
Dorothy Mae Taylor, first African-American woman to serve in the Louisiana House, 1971–1980; member of the New Orleans City Council, 1986–1994
Charles Laveau Trudeau, early 19th century mayor of New Orleans
A.P. Tureaud, attorney
Jorge Ubico, exiled president of Guatemala 
José de Villamil (or José Villamil), father of the independence of Ecuador
David Vitter, U.S. Senator, 2005–2017
John Volz, late U.S. attorney for the Eastern District of Louisiana
Chatham Roberdeau Wheat, leader of the Louisiana Tigers during the US Civil War 
Edward Douglass White, Chief Justice of the United States Supreme Court
 John C. White, Louisiana education superintendent since 2012; superintendent of the Recovery School District in New Orleans, 2011
Robert Wilkie, National Security Assistant to the President
Clint Williamson, U.S. Ambassador, White House policy official, United Nations envoy
John Minor Wisdom, judge of the United States Court of Appeals for the Fifth Circuit
Andrew Young, politician

Math, science, and invention 
Ruth Benerito, inventor of wrinkle-free cotton
Alfred H. Clifford, mathematician
Isaac Cline, meteorologist and writer
Andrew Higgins, ship builder and inventor
Emile Lamm, inventor
Theodore K. Lawless, dermatologist, medical researcher, and philanthropist 
Jean Alexandre LeMat, inventor
Abraham Louis Levin, physician and inventor of the Levin Tube
Levi Spear Parmley, inventor of dental floss
Mark Plotkin, ethnobotanist
John Leonard Riddell, inventor of the binocular microscope
Norbert Rilleaux, inventor, engineer
A. Baldwin Wood, inventor and engineer

Music 
August Alsina, singer/songwriter
Phil Anselmo, musician
Louis Armstrong, musician and entertainer
B.G., rapper
Baby Boy Da Prince, rapper
Achille Baquet, musician
George Baquet, musician
Paul Barbarin, musician and composer
Pat Barberot, band leader
Danny Barker, musician, vocalist, and writer
Dave Bartholomew, musician, composer, promoter
Jon Batiste, singer, composer, pianist, jazz musician
Sidney Bechet, musician
Better Than Ezra, rock group
Birdman aka Baby, rapper, producer
Big Freedia, bounce artist
Terence Blanchard, musician and composer
Peter Bocage, Jazz trumpeter and violinist
Buddy Bolden, musician, early jazz figure
Sharkey Bonano, Jazz musician
James Booker, musician
Larry Borenstein, founder of Preservation Hall 
Connee Boswell, singer, member of the Boswell Sisters singing group
Helvetia "Vet" Boswell, singer, member of the Boswell Sisters singing group
Martha Boswell, singer, member of the Boswell Sisters singing group
Pud Brown, jazz musician
George Brunis, jazz trombonist
Collie Buddz, reggae/dancehall artist
C-Murder, rapper
Cane Hill, nu-metal group
Paul Caporino, songwriter, musician, lead singer of M.O.T.O.
Alton "Big Al" Carson, blues singer
Alex Chilton, songwriter, guitarist, music producer, lead singer of the Box Tops and Big Star
Choppa, rapper
Merry Clayton, singer 
Jon Cleary, funk and R&B musician
Lee Collins, jazz trumpeter
Harry Connick Jr., musician and entertainer
Cowboy Mouth, band
Barry Cowsill, musician
Paul Crawford, jazz musician, music historian
Curren$y, rapper
Edmond Dede, musician, composer
Fernando del Valle, operatic tenor
DJ Khaled, DJ
Dr. John, musician
Johnny Dodds, jazz clarinetist and saxophonist
Fats Domino, musician
Lee Dorsey, singer
Down, metal band
Tom Drummond, bassist of Better Than Ezra
Champion Jack Dupree, pianist, singer
Frankie Dusen, jazz trombonist
Ernie K-Doe, singer, "Emperor of the Universe"
Lars Edegran, bandleader
Lionel Ferbos, jazz musician
Lucky Daye, singer, songwriter,  musician, performer
Giuseppe Ferrata, composer, pianist, and university professor
Frankie Ford, singer, entertainer
Pops Foster, jazz musician
Vernel Fournier, jazz drummer 
Pete Fountain, musician, clarinet player, jazz, pop, and swing
Mannie Fresh, DJ, producer, rapper
Frank Froeba, musician, jazz, pianist, band leader
The Funky Meters, musicians and singers
Kevin Gates, rapper
George Girard, musician
Victor Goines, jazz musician, dean of jazz at the Juilliard School
Louis Moreau Gottschalk, pianist and composer
Kevin Griffin, musician, lead singer for Better than Ezra
Gudda Gudda, rapper
Donald Harrison, musician
Clarence "Frogman" Henry, singer and musician
Al Hirt, musician, trumpet, jazz, pop, and swing
Moses Hogan, musician, composer
Linda Hopkins, blues and gospel singer
Noah Howard, jazz musician
Armand "Jump" Jackson, blues drummer and bandleader
Mahalia Jackson, gospel singer
Pervis Jackson, rhythm & blues singer member of The Spinners
Luke James, R&B singer, actor
Jay Electronica, rapper and producer
N.O. Joe, music producer, musician
Little Sonny Jones, blues singer
Juvenile, rapper
Freddie Keppard, jazz cornetist
Kid Ory, musician
Kidd Kidd, rapper
Earl King, musician
Solange Knowles, musician, songwriter
Papa Jack Laine, bandleader
Nick LaRocca, early jazz figure
Walter "Popee" Lastie, drummer
Meghan Linsey, singer-songwriter, contestant from The Voice season 8
Lil' Fizz, singer, rapper
Lil Romeo, rapper
Lil Wayne, rapper
Lloyd, singer
Rico Love, singer/songwriter
Mac, rapper
Magic, rapper
Magnolia Shorty, New Orleans bounce artist
Mack Maine, rapper
Dave Malone, songwriter, guitarist, music producer, guitarist and vocalist in The New Orleans Radiators
Mannie Fresh, rapper, producer, disc jockey
Wingy Manone, jazz trumpeter, and singer
Angélica María, Mexican singer-songwriter and entertainer, "La Novia de Mexico"
Paul Mares, jazz musician
Branford Marsalis, musician, alto, soprano, tenor, and baritone saxophones
Ellis Marsalis Jr., musician and educator, piano
Ellis Marsalis Sr., music patron, businessman and advocate
Jason Marsalis, musician (drums, vibraphone)
Wynton Marsalis, musician, trumpet, cornet, flumpet, flugelhorn
Master P, rapper, businessman, and mogul
Cosimo Matassa, music studio entrepreneur
Jimmy Maxwell, bandleader
Irvin Mayfield, musician
The Medicine Men, producers, singers (Mo B. Dick and Odell), rappers (KLC and Mo B. Dick)
The Meters, musicians and singers
Lizzie Miles, singer
Mr. Quintron, organist
Deacon John Moore, musician and bandleader
Jelly Roll Morton, musician and composer, early jazz figure
Teedra Moses, R&B and soul singer-songwriter
Mutemath, band
Mystick Krewe of Clearlight
Mystikal, rapper
The Neville Brothers, musicians and singers
Ivan Neville, phunk, R&B
Randy Newman, musician
Camille Nickerson, musician and composer
Normani, born Normani Kordei Hamilton, singer
Frank Ocean, singer
Joe "King" Oliver, musician
Lisette Oropesa, opera singer, soprano
Jimmy Palao, musician, bandleader
Earl Palmer, musician
Robert Parker, musician and singer
Partners-N-Crime, rap duo
Nicholas Payton, musician
Marguerite Piazza, operatic soprano
Piggy D., bassist
Genevieve Pitot, composer, musician, dancer
George Porter Jr., musician
Louis Prima, musician (trumpet), singer, bandleader, entertainer, aka "The King of the Swing"
Professor Longhair, born Henry Byrd, pianist, singer
The Radiators, rock band
Mac Rebennack, "Dr. John"
Rebirth Brass Band, band
Trent Reznor, musician, producer
Dawn Richard, former member of Danity Kane and Diddy-Dirty Money
Rising Appalachia, world, folk, roots, and soul group
Jason Ross, Seven Mary Three frontman
Kermit Ruffins, jazz trumpeter, singer and composer
Bill Russell, music historian and composer
Paul Sanchez, singer-songwriter and guitarist
Silkk the Shocker, rapper
Bill Sinegal, bassist and songwriter
Skull Duggery, rapper
Soulja Slim, rapper
Chloe Smith, singer-songwriter, multi-instrumentalist
Leah Song, singer-songwriter, multi-instrumentalist
Stooges Brass Band, New Orleans funk brass band
$uicideboy$, rap duo
Babe Stovall, blues singer and guitarist, "Mr. Bojangles"
Supagroup, rock band
Irma Thomas, rhythm and blues singer, aka "Soul Queen of New Orleans"
Allen Toussaint, musician, composer, record producer
Norman Treigle, opera singer
Trombone Shorty, born Troy Andrews, musician
Turk, rapper
George Wein, founder of the New Orleans Jazz & Heritage Festival 
Michael White, Jazz musician
Charles "Hungry" Williams, Rhythm & Blues drummer
Larry Williams, Rock 'n' Roll/R&B pianist
"Scarface" John Williams, singer
Spencer Williams, songwriter
Young V, rapper
Linnzi Zaorski
Zebra, band

Religion 

Antonio de Sedella, early Roman Catholic leader in New Orleans
Henriette DeLille, founder of the order of the Sisters of the Holy Family 
Jesse Duplantis, televangelist 
J. D. Grey, pastor, former president of the Southern Baptist Convention
Marie-Madeleine Hachard, Ursuline abbess, documented early history of New Orleans
Philip Hannan, former archbishop of New Orleans
Francis L. Hawks, clergyman, first president of Tulane University 
Jerome LeDoux, Roman Catholic priest
Joseph Francis Rummel, former archbishop of New Orleans
Lory Schaff, member of the Sisters of St. Joseph who founded centers for adult literacy education
Francis Xavier Seelos, missionary who ministered to victims of yellow fever epidemics
John William Shaw, former archbishop of New Orleans

Sports 

Ashley Ambrose, NFL player, Atlanta Falcons and New Orleans Saints, graduated from Alcee Fortier High School
Nehemiah Atkinson, professional tennis player and coach
D.J. Augustin, NBA player
Tom Benson, owner of the New Orleans Saints
Armand Blackmar, nineteenth century chess player and music publisher
Delvin Breaux, gridiron football player
Stanley Brundy, basketball player
Cethan Carter, football player
Will Clark, former Major League Baseball player
Landon Collins, NFL player for the New York Giants
Tazzie Colomb, IFBB professional female bodybuilder and powerlifter
Scott Cochran, special teams coordinator for the Georgia Bulldogs
Ernie Danjean, former Green Bay Packers linebacker
Orleans Darkwa, professional football player
Tom Dempsey, former NFL kicker, held longest field goal record for over 43 years
David Dixon, professional sports advocate for New Orleans Saints, Louisiana Superdome, USFL, World Championship Tennis
Scott Dohmann, former MLB pitcher
Corey Dowden, former NFL defensive back
Clyde Drexler, former University of Houston and NBA star, member of Basketball Hall of Fame
Bobby Duhon, professional football player 
Marshall Faulk, professional football star (St. Louis Rams), member of Pro Football Hall of Fame
Steve Foley, former defensive back for Denver Broncos
Matt Forte, running back for Chicago Bears, New York Jets
John Fourcade, former NFL and CFL quarterback, sports analyst 
De'Aaron Fox, point guard for Sacramento Kings
Nolan Franz, former Green Bay Packers wide receiver
Leonard Fournette, NFL player, running back for the Tampa Bay Buccaneers
Harry P. Gamble, football player, swimmer, gymnast, boxer, and attorney
Eddie Garcia, former Green Bay Packers placekicker
Larry Gilbert, Major League Baseball player
Tookie Gilbert, Major League Baseball player
Tad Gormley, athletic trainer, coach, and official
Danny Granger, forward for NBA's Indiana Pacers, Miami Heat
Cortez Hankton, former NFL player who is currently the passing game coordinator & wide receivers coach for the LSU Tigers
Adrian Hardy, NFL player
Chris Henry, former NFL wide receiver
Chris Horton, former NFL safety
Kevin Hughes, former NFL offensive tackle
Tory James, former cornerback for Cincinnati Bengals
Avery Johnson, former National Basketball Association player, former coach of Dallas Mavericks
Deion Jones, NFL linebacker for the Atlanta Falcons
Junkyard Dog, stage name of Sylvester Ritter, former professional wrestler
Robert Kelley, Washington Redskins running back
Shaun King, former NFL quarterback
Kerry Kittles, former NBA player for New Jersey Nets
Dominik Koepfer, professional tennis player
Lester Lautenschlaeger, football player, politician, first director of New Orleans Recreation Department 
Kendrick Lewis, NFL free safety, played for Kansas City Chiefs and Baltimore Ravens, attended Ole Miss
Michael Lewis, former New Orleans Saints wide receiver
Rydell Malancon, former NFL linebacker
Archie Manning, former New Orleans Saints quarterback, father of Peyton and Eli
Eli Manning, New York Giants quarterback
Peyton Manning, former Indianapolis Colts and Denver Broncos quarterback
Pete Maravich, basketball Hall of Famer, played for LSU and NBA's New Orleans Jazz
Sammy Martin, former New England Patriots running back
Tyrann Mathieu, player for NFL's Kansas City Chiefs
Bo McCalebb, Macedonian basketball player who plays for Montepaschi Siena
Max McGee, NFL player on five championship teams
Sylvester McGrew, former Green Bay Packers defensive end
Greg Monroe, college basketball player for Georgetown University
Paul Morphy, world chess champion
Patrick Mullins, professional soccer player
Steve Mura, retired pitcher in Major League Baseball
Eddie Murray, prolific NFL placekicker
Antonio Narcisse, football player
Herman Neugass, Track & field athlete who boycotted the Berlin Olympic trials
Mel Ott, Major League Baseball Hall of Famer
Micah Owings, MLB pitcher
Robert Pack, NBA player, assistant coach for New Orleans Pelicans
Emmett Paré, professional tennis player and coach
Joe Pasternack, head basketball coach at UC Santa Barbara
Audrey Patterson, first African-American woman to win Olympic medal
Chris Quinn, former NBA player and current Miami Heat assistant coach 
Eldridge Recasner, former NBA player
Ham Richardson, professional tennis player
Alana Shipp, American/Israeli IFBB professional bodybuilder
Nate Singleton, former wide receiver for San Francisco 49ers
Neil Smith, former defensive end, Kansas City Chiefs
Truett Smith, former football player
Rusty Staub, Major League Baseball player
Ricky Starks, All Elite Wrestling FTW Heavyweight Champion.
Kordell Stewart, former NFL quarterback
Patrick Surtain, former NFL cornerback
Ron Swoboda, former New York Mets outfielder
Ike Taylor, cornerback, Pittsburgh Steelers
Roosevelt Taylor, safety, 1963 NFL champion, Chicago Bears
Vincent Taylor, defensive tackle for the Atlanta Falcons
Taryn Terrell, professional wrestler for Total Nonstop Action Wrestling
Mike Wallace, wide receiver for Pittsburgh Steelers
Bryce Washington (born 1996), basketball player for Hapoel Galil Elyon of the Israeli Basketball Premier League
Ron Washington, former MLB player and manager who is currently the third base coach for the Atlanta Braves 
Reggie Wayne, wide receiver for Indianapolis Colts
Aeneas Williams, former cornerback for St. Louis Rams
Jason Williams (born 1983), basketball player for Hapoel Be'er Sheva of the National Basketball League of Israel
John "Hot Rod" Williams, longtime professional basketball player
Korey Williams, Canadian Football League player

Other 

Ruby Bridges, commemorated for her role, as a child, in racial integration of the New Orleans Public School System
Betty DeGeneres, LGBT rights activist
Caroline Dormon, horticulturalist and historian
David Ferrie, pilot investigated in the assassination of President Kennedy
Myra Clark Gaines, socialite and subject of the longest lawsuit in US history
Jean Margaret Gordon, suffragette
Kate M. Gordon, suffragette
Margaret Haughery, philanthropist
Marie Alice Heine, first American Princess of Monaco
Sir Lady Java, drag queen, actress and transgender rights activist 
Blaine Kern, Mardi Gras float designer and builder
TJ Kirk, Youtuber
Marie Laveau, "voodoo queen"
Sara T. Mayo, physician and humanitarian reformer
Eleanor McMain, civic activist
Sally Miller: The Lost German Slave Girl
Allison 'Tootie' Montana, Mardi Gras Indian, "chief of chiefs"
Paul Morphy, unofficial world chess champion
Homer Plessy, early civil rights activist
Edith Rosenwald Stern, philanthropist
Paul Tulane, benefactor of Tulane University
Sylvanie Williams, educator and women's club activist
Sophie B. Wright, educator and clubwoman

See also
List of people from Louisiana
List of Tulane University people
List of Loyola University New Orleans people

References

New Orleans

New Orleans
New Orleans-related lists